The Wooster Book Company is a publishing firm and bookstore located in Wooster, Ohio.

Company profile
The Wooster Book Company promotes and develops literary works of regional interest to Ohio and surrounding areas; especially those written works which feature themes of natural history and rural living.

A small publisher with over one-hundred titles, The Wooster Book Company has produced titles such as Ohio’s Bicentennial Barns and Covered Bridges: Ohio, Kentucky, West Virginia. As the publisher of books by Louis Bromfield, one title, Early Autumn, a novel, has won the Pulitzer Prize for Fiction and one title, Awake and Rehearse, collects several O. Henry Prize stories.

The Wooster Book Company also publishes books by Scott Russell Sanders, a winner of the Lannan Foundation literary award, and by Wes Jackson, president of the Land Institute.

The publishing company is directly affiliated with the bookstore of the same name.

History
The Wooster Book Company was established in September 1992 as an independent bookstore.  It now occupies  with over 40,000 titles.

In 2000, The Wooster Book Company took over the sponsorship and administration of the Buckeye Book Fair, Ohio's largest literary event.  The Book Fair is open to the public, with approximately one hundred authors participating in the annual day-long festival.

Under the trade name “The Wooster Book Company,” its first title, a corporate history of Rubbermaid, written by retired Rubbermaid CEO and chairman of the board, Donald E. Noble, was released in 1996.

Subsequent publishing projects have been done in association with the Ohio State University Medical Center, Ohio Department of Natural Resources, Ohio Agricultural Research and Development Center, Ohio Library Council, and the American Angus Association.

Additional titles in many areas of interest have been released under ISBN prefixes 1-59098 and 1-888683.

Awards
As a bellwether establishment of a downtown (Main Street) revitalization, The Wooster Book Company was the recipient of a community design commission award in 1993 for restoration and renovation and a Chamber of Commerce “Successful Business Award” (1995).

Children's programs in the bookstore were recognized with a “Friend of Young Children” award in 1997. The business expanded in 2000, rebuilt and restored its facade in 2001 as well as expanding their publishing services operation in the same year. This resulted in a second recognition for revitalization and a second nomination for a Chamber of Commerce successful business award in 2005.

In 2002, David Wiesenberg, co-owner of The Wooster Book Company was recognized with an Ohioana Citation for his contribution to the community and for commitment to Ohio literature.

The Wooster Book Company was recognized in 2008 by the Ohio Center for the Book, an affiliate of the Library of Congress, as an Advocate for the Literary Arts.

References

External links
Public radio profile of Louis Bromfield
Buckeye Book Fair
Great Lakes Independent Booksellers Association (GLiBA)
Malabar Farm State Park
Ohioana Library
Ohio Center for the Book

Independent bookstores of the United States
Small press publishing companies
Book publishing companies based in Ohio
Publishing companies established in 1992